Quick change, quick-change or Quick Change may refer to

 Quick Change, 1990 American comedy film
 Quick Change (2013 film), 2013 Philippine drama film
 Quick-change (music), a variation of the twelve-bar blues
 Quick-change (performance), a performance trick where a one will quickly change attire
 Quick-change scam, a scammer confuses staff by repeatedly changing the means of payment